Jacek Małachowski, of the Nałęcz coat-of-arms (1737–1821) was a Polish nobleman, politician and administrator as well as Polish chancellor.

He was Crown Deputy Master of the Pantry since 1764. Referendary of the Crown in 1764-1780, Deputy Chancellor the Crown since 1780 and Grand Chancellor of the Crown since 1786. Starost of Piotrków, Radom, Stary Sącz and Gródek.
 
Marshal of the Coronation Sejm in 3–20 December 1764 in Warsaw.

He was a supporter of the Russian faction. During the Great Sejm of 1788-1792 he supported tentative reforms such as strengthening of the executive and army, but also maintaining ties with Russia. He was among the opponents of the Constitution of 3 May and eventually joined the Targowica Confederation that overthrew it.

In 1804 he founded a manufactory that was one of the origins of the Ćmielów Porcelain Factory.

References

1737 births
1821 deaths
People from Końskie County
People from Sandomierz Voivodeship
Jacek
Secular senators of the Polish–Lithuanian Commonwealth
Members of the Sejm of the Polish–Lithuanian Commonwealth
Targowica confederates
Recipients of the Order of the White Eagle (Poland)
Crown Vice-Chancellors